The 77th Infantry Division (77-ya Pekhotnaya Diviziya) was an infantry formation of the Russian Imperial Army.

History 
The 77th was created as a reserve unit to replace active units sent into combat during the Russo-Japanese War in 1904 under the command of Major General Alexander Lebedev. It was disbanded in 1906.

It was again formed as a reserve division in 1914 when the Russian Imperial Army mobilized for World War I. It was disbanded in 1918 when the army demobilized following the Russian Revolution.

Organization
1st Brigade
305th Infantry Regiment
306th Infantry Regiment
2nd Brigade
307th Infantry Regiment
308th Infantry Regiment

References

Infantry divisions of the Russian Empire
Military units and formations established in 1904
Military units and formations disestablished in 1918